Octavian Brânzei (born 28 September 1928) was a Romanian footballer who played as a defender. He was part of Politehnica Timișoara's team that won the 1957–1958 Cupa României, the first trophy in the club's history. In 2008 Brânzei received post-mortem the Honorary Citizen of Timișoara title.

International career
Octavian Brânzei played two games at international level for Romania making his debut in a friendly against Bulgaria which ended with a 2–0 loss. He also played in a 3–0 victory against Greece at the 1958 World Cup qualifiers.

Honours
Politehnica Timișoara
Divizia B: 1952
Cupa României: 1957–58
Farul Constanța
Divizia B: 1961–62

Notes

References

External links
Octavian Brânzei at Labtof.ro

1928 births
Romanian footballers
Romania international footballers
Association football defenders
Liga I players
Liga II players
FC Politehnica Timișoara players
FCV Farul Constanța players
FC CFR Timișoara players
Year of death missing